Vithalwadi is a railway station on the Central line of the Mumbai Suburban Railway network. It is on the Karjat route. Kalyan is the previous stop and Ulhasnagar is the next stop.

Gallery

References

Railway stations in Thane district
Mumbai Suburban Railway stations
Mumbai CR railway division
Transport in Kalyan-Dombivli
Kalyan-Lonavala rail line